Granica (meaning "border" in Polish, Serbo-Croatian, Slovene and Lower Sorbian) may refer to:

Places

Poland 
 Granica, Lower Silesian Voivodeship (south-west Poland)
 Granica, Podkarpackie Voivodeship (south-east Poland)
 Granica, Warsaw West County in Masovian Voivodeship (east-central Poland)
 Granica, Opole Voivodeship (south-west Poland)
 Granica, West Pomeranian Voivodeship (north-west Poland)

Serbia 
 Granica (Bojnik) in southern Serbia

Other uses 
 Granica (grape), another name for the Italian wine grape Aglianico
 Granica (The Frontier), a novel by the Polish writer Zofia Nałkowska

See also 
 Granitsa (disambiguation)
 Granice (disambiguation)
 Hranice (disambiguation)